Synaemops is a genus of spiders in the family Thomisidae. It was first described in 1929 by Mello-Leitão. , it contains 4 species from South America.

References

Thomisidae
Araneomorphae genera
Spiders of South America